In The Mid-Nite Hour is the fifth studio album by Warren G, released on the label Hawino Records on October 11, 2005. His first single was "Get U Down" featuring Ice Cube, B-Real, and Snoop Dogg, and his follow up single was "I Need A Light" featuring Nate Dogg. Neither single was able to make the Billboard charts for music and the album peaked at number 80 on the Billboard 200 album chart selling 14,800 in its first week. It is notable for having a laid back feel to it and featuring rapper Bishop Lamont on seven tracks. The album was released in the UK on March 25, 2006.

Critical reception

Steve 'Flash' Juon of RapReviews praised Warren's musicianship for crafting well-produced tracks with a strong featured cast while maintaining his smooth flow, saying that "In the Mid-Nite Hour may not raise him to prominence, but it won't disappoint his audience or the casual purchaser who wants some nice shit to cruise to." Jason Birchmeier of AllMusic praised the independent approach to the album and found it more approachable than Warren's previous effort The Return of the Regulator. Jozen Cummings of Vibe commended Warren for attempting to recapture his early work but found it too brief and often backfiring on itself, concluding that "it's no secret that his G-funk prime has passed."

Track listing

References

2005 albums
Warren G albums
Albums produced by Warren G
Albums produced by Terrace Martin
Albums produced by Raphael Saadiq